David Russell (born 4 January 1982) is an Australian racing driver. Russell has competed in the Repco Supercars Championship intermittently since 2003 and is now an endurance co-driver in the Pirtek Enduro Cup with Erebus Motorsport in a Holden Commodore (ZB), alongside Brodie Kostecki.

Racing career
Russell started his circuit racing career in Production Car racing, driving a Suzuki Swift in the 2000 Australian GT Production Car Championship. In 2001 he transitioned to a Proton Satria in the same entry level class of the same series. He
finished runner-up in class behind the Holden Astra of Luke Youlden. Russell stayed racing Protons through to the 2004 season when he finished third in the 2004 Australian Production Car Championship. Russell then spent three years in Carrera Cup with Sherrin Motor Sport, culminating with third place in the 2008 series behind Craig Baird and Dean Fiore, which also then led to various endurance race drives in Europe and Asia with Juniper Racing and Lago Racing.

Supercars Championship
Russell raced the 2003 Konica V8 Supercar Series racing a Ford Falcon (AU) with the Chance of a Lifetime team and made a single appearance at the Bathurst 1000 with Fernandez Motorsport. Russell returned to V8 Supercar racing after winning the 2008 Queensland 500 in a Sheerin Motorsport entered Ford Falcon (AU). Russell then moved into V8 Supercar full-time in 2009 with Howard Racing and finished third behind Jonathon Webb and James Moffat. 2010 was a disappointment, after moving to the team Webb won the championship with, Russell finished fifth. Staying with MW Motorsport in 2011, Russell again finished third, this time behind Andrew Thompson and Jack Perkins. Endurance drives with major teams also took place, Dick Johnson Racing in 2010 and Kelly Racing in 2011 which led to a Russell taking leadership role in Kelly Racing's 2012 Dunlop V8 Supercar Series team, Dreamtime Racing.

Career results

Bathurst 1000 results

References

External links
David Russell V8 Supercars Official Profile
Driver Database profile
Profile on Racing Reference

1982 births
Living people
People from the Northern Rivers
Racing drivers from New South Wales
Supercars Championship drivers
Blancpain Endurance Series drivers
24 Hours of Spa drivers
ADAC GT Masters drivers
Australian Endurance Championship drivers
Kelly Racing drivers
Nismo drivers
Dick Johnson Racing drivers
Matt Stone Racing drivers
M-Sport drivers